The LA-2A Leveling Amplifier is an audio compressor produced by Teletronix Engineering Company from 1965 until 1969, and reissued in 2000 by Universal Audio.

History
The LA-2A was invented by James F. Lawrence II, founder of the Teletronix Engineering Company in Pasadena, California in the early 1960s. The LA-2A had evolved from Lawrence's first leveling amplifier, the LA-1, which was favored by Gene Autry, and its successor, the LA-2, which had been adopted by CBS and RCA. In 1965, Lawrence sold Teletronix to Babcock Electronics of Costa Mesa, California, and in 1967 Bill Putnam's company Studio Electronics (eventually renamed UREI), acquired Babcock's broadcast division, including the Teletronix brand.

Three versions of the LA-2A were made until 1969.

After Universal Audio was re-established in 1999, the company re-issued an updated version of the LA-2A.

The LA-2A was inducted into the TECnology Hall of Fame in 2004.

Design
The LA-2A is a hand-wired, tube-based compressor. It uses an electroluminescent panel together with a cadmium-sulfide light-dependent resistor (which in the LA-2A's own terminology is called the T4 cell) to provide gain reduction. The properties of the T4 give the LA-2A its unique character by making it an entirely program-dependent design.

The LA-2A has simple controls: a Peak-Reduction knob controls the gain of the side-chain circuit, and therefore, the gain reduction; a Gain Control for make-up gain; and a Limit/Compress switch which alters the compression ratio. The VU meter may also be switched to show the gain reduction or output level.

The average attack time is 10 milliseconds, while the release time is about 60 ms for 50% release and 0.5 to 5 seconds for full release, depending on the previous program material.

In use
The LA-2A has the ability to preserve the impression of performance dynamics while performing extreme level management—a sonic character that makes it sought after by many recording engineers, particularly for use on vocals and bass guitar.

Recording engineers who cite the LA-2A in their work include Joe Barresi, Mike Clink, and Tony Maserati. The LA-2A was used to record Alanis Morissette's vocals on Jagged Little Pill, Kurt Cobain's vocals on Nevermind, and Shakira's vocals on "Hips Don't Lie". Joe Chiccarelli used an LA-2A to add distortion to Jack White's vocals on The White Stripes' album, Icky Thump.

Software emulations
Universal Audio has offered an officially-branded Teletronix LA-2A software plug-in since 2002, when they included the first version with their UAD-1 PCI DSP card. An updated version was introduced in 2013, when UA released the LA-2A Classic Leveler Collection for their UAD-2 platform, which included three different versions of LA-2A: the late-'60s 'Silver' version, the mid-'60s 'Gray' version, and the early-'60s LA-2.

Bomb Factory Digital released an emulation of the LA-2 as part of their Classic Compressors for Pro Tools plug-in bundle. This plug-in has since been re-branded as the Avid BF-2A.

Waves Audio released a software plug-in emulation of the Teletronix LA-2A with Chris Lord-Alge's personal presets as the CLA-2A Compressor/Limiter plug-in.

Other software versions of the LA-2A include the Cakewalk CA-2A, IK Multimedia T-RackS White 2A, and the Native Instruments VC 2A by Softube.

See also
 UREI
 The LA-3A, a transistorised version of the LA-2A
 The 1176 Peak Limiter, another popular vintage compressor descended from the LA-2A

References 

Dynamics processing
Effects units